Pomasia sparsata is a moth in the family Geometridae. It is found in India.

References

Moths described in 1902
Eupitheciini